Jermaine Curtis Johnson II (born January 7, 1999) is an American football defensive end for the New York Jets of the National Football League (NFL). He played college football at Independence CC and Georgia before transferring to Florida State in 2021 where he was named the ACC Defensive Player of the Year. Johnson was drafted by the New York Jets with the twenty-sixth overall pick of the 2022 NFL Draft.

Early life and high school
Johnson grew up in Eden Prairie, Minnesota, and attended Eden Prairie High School. As a senior he was named All-Metro after recording 37 tackles and seven sacks. Johnson was academically ineligible to play NCAA Division I football after graduating with a 1.9 GPA.

College career
Johnson began his collegiate career at Independence Community College. While at Independence, he was featured in the fourth season of the Netflix documentary series Last Chance U where he played under head coach Jason Brown. As a freshman, he had 58 tackles, eight sacks and three forced fumbles. Johnson transferred to the University of Georgia following the season.

Johnson played in every game for the Georgia Bulldogs as a sophomore, where he had 20 tackles and 2.5 sacks. As a senior, he finished third on the team with four sacks with 16 total tackles and 11 quarterback hurries. Towards the end of the season Johnson entered the transfer portal and enrolled at Florida State for his final season of NCAA eligibility. Johnson had seven tackles, 2.5 tackles for loss and 1.5 sacks in his first game for the Seminoles, a 41-38 overtime loss to Notre Dame, and was named the Atlantic Coast Conference Defensive Lineman of the Week. He was named the ACC Defensive Player of the Year and first-team All-ACC after he finished the season with 70 tackles and led the ACC with 18 tackles for loss and 12 sacks.

Professional career

New York Jets
Johnson was selected in the first round with the 26th overall pick by the New York Jets in the 2022 NFL Draft.

References

External links
 New York Jets bio
Independence CC Pirates bio
Florida State Seminoles bio
Georgia Bulldogs bio

Living people
1999 births
Players of American football from Minnesota
American football defensive ends
Florida State Seminoles football players
Georgia Bulldogs football players
Independence Pirates football players
People from Eden Prairie, Minnesota
All-American college football players
New York Jets players